Odostomia mariae is a species of sea snail, a marine gastropod mollusc in the family Pyramidellidae, the pyrams and their allies.

Distribution
This species occurs in the Pacific Ocean off Peru.

References

External links
 To USNM Invertebrate Zoology Mollusca Collection
 To World Register of Marine Species

mariae
Gastropods described in 1928